Diervilla sessilifolia, the southern bush honeysuckle, a member of the honeysuckle family Caprifoliaceae which blooms in summer, is a perennial shrub found in the Great Smoky Mountains and the southern Appalachian Mountains. Southern bush honeysuckle can be found growing on bluffs, along slopes and stream banks, and bordering woodlands. It is a threatened species in Tennessee.

This compact, deciduous shrub, typically growing three to five feet tall, spreads by suckering in zones 4 to 8. It is drought tolerant, grows in full sun as well as partial shade, and works best in a woodland garden. 

D. sessilifolia has been marked as a pollinator plant, supporting and attracting bumblebees and hummingbirds.

References

Horn, Cathcart, Hemmerly, Duhl, Wildflowers of Tennessee, the Ohio Valley, and the Southern Appalachians, Lone Pine Publishing, (2005) p 309, 

Caprifoliaceae
Flora of the Appalachian Mountains
Endemic flora of the United States
Flora of Alabama
Flora of Georgia (U.S. state)
Flora of North Carolina
Flora of South Carolina
Flora of Tennessee
Least concern flora of the United States